Kilbirnie is a rural locality in the Toowoomba Region, Queensland, Australia. In the  Kilbirnie had a population of 60 people.

History 
Mount Darry Provisional School opened on 28 August 1899. On 1 January 1909 it became Mount Darry State School. In 1915 it was renamed Zahley State School and in 1925 it was renamed  Kilbirnie State School. It closed on 31 December 1961. It was located at 752 Goombungee Kilburnie Road.

In the  Kilbirnie had a population of 60 people.

References 

Toowoomba Region
Localities in Queensland